WXXK (100.5 FM; "Kixx 100.5") is a radio station broadcasting a country music format. Licensed to Lebanon, New Hampshire, United States, the station serves the Lebanon-Rutland-White River Junction area.  The station is owned by Great Eastern Radio, LLC and features programming from Westwood One and the Premiere Radio Networks.

History

The station went on the air as WNTK-FM on December 18, 1990. On November 30, 1992, the station changed its call sign to WNBX, on December 19, 1994 to WUVR, on March 11, 1996 back to WNBX, on February 15, 1997 to WVRR, and on March 31, 1997 to the current WXXK.

Until March 16, 2015, WXXK was simulcast in the Keene area on WKKN 101.9 FM. It had also been simulcast in southern Vermont on WTHK at 100.7 MHz in Wilmington.

References

External links

XXK
Radio stations established in 1990
Lebanon, New Hampshire
Country radio stations in the United States